SWEEPS-11 is an extrasolar planet orbiting the star SWEEPS J175902.67−291153.5 in the constellation Sagittarius, approximately 27,710 light years away from the Solar System (based on a distance modulus of 14.1), making it (along with SWEEPS-04) the most distant exoplanet(s) known. This planet was found in 2006 by the Sagittarius Window Eclipsing Extrasolar Planet Search (SWEEPS) program that uses the transit method.

This hot Jupiter has a mass 9.7 times that of Jupiter and a radius of 1.13 times that of Jupiter. The planet orbits at about 1.75 times closer to the star than 51 Pegasi b is to 51 Pegasi, taking only 1.8 days or 43 hours to orbit the star.

See also
 SWEEPS-04
 SWEEPS-10

References

External links

 The Extrasolar Planets Encyclopaedia: Notes for planet SWEEPS-11

Sagittarius (constellation)
Transiting exoplanets
Hot Jupiters
Giant planets
Exoplanets discovered in 2006
Sagittarius Window Eclipsing Extrasolar Planet Search
Exoplanet candidates